Pirogov is a 1947 Soviet biopic film directed by Grigori Kozintsev, based on the life of Russian scientist and doctor Nikolay Ivanovich Pirogov (1810-1881). Pirogov is famous for being  the founder of field surgery.

Cast
 Konstantin Skorobogatov - Pirogov
 Vladimir Chestnokov - Ipatov
 Sergei Yarov - Skulachenko
 Aleksei Dikiy		
 Olga Lebzak - Vakulyna
 Nikolay Cherkasov	
 Andrei Kostrichkin
 Tatyana Piletskaya - Vakulyna

External links

1947 films
1940s biographical drama films
Soviet biographical drama films
Soviet war drama films
Russian biographical drama films
Crimean War films
Films set in the Russian Empire
Lenfilm films
Soviet black-and-white films
Films directed by Grigori Kozintsev
Films scored by Dmitri Shostakovich
Russian black-and-white films
1940s Russian-language films